All Star Records Now Orfanato Music Group is Don Omar's record label. He released the album Los Bandoleros under this label in 2005. Omar is the label's biggest attraction. It operates as a subsidiary of, and is distributed through, Universal Music Group's Machete Records.

History
After the debut of the album The Last Don, Don Omar was granted his own label. Since 2004, his label became successful for not only himself, but his appointed label artists.

Associations

Artists
 Don Omar
 Rell w/ Orfanato Music Group
 Glory
 Marcy Place w/ Orfanato Music Group
 Cynthia Antigua w/ Orfanato Music Group
 Chino & Nacho w/Orfanato Music Group
 Farruko w/ Orfanato Music Group
 Kendo Kaponi w/ Orfanato Music Group

Producers
 Danny Fornaris
 Lex
 Robbin
 A&X
 Link On

Albums
The following albums were released under Orfanato Music Group.
 Don Omar: Los Bandoleros
 Don Omar: King of Kings
 All Star Records Presenta: Linaje Escogido
 Don Omar: Los Bandoleros Reloaded
 Don Omar: King of Kings: Armageddon Edition
 All Star Records Presenta: Don Omar - All Star Hits
Marcy Place: B From Marcy Place

See also
 List of record labels
 Machete Music

External links
 Website

References 

2004 establishments in Puerto Rico
Don Omar
Puerto Rican record labels
Reggaeton record labels
Hip hop record labels
Record labels established in 2004
Puerto Rican brands